The Urshan Library is an academic library that supports the faculty, staff, and students of Urshan Graduate School of Theology and Urshan College.

Collection development began with the acquisition of the personal library of Ernest E. Jolley, a United Pentecostal Church International minister. Rev Jolley's library was donated to Gateway College of Evangelism and consisted of almost ten thousand volumes. This donation was catalogued and shelved in one of the large classrooms. A major shift in the library took place in 2001 when the Urshan Graduate School of Theology began operation. Intentional acquisition of material relevant to curriculum and research of the school's professional staff became a top priority. Over  of floor space was remodeled and designed for library use. The library now consists of approximately 40,000 holdings with 30,000 titles. Future development will broaden to other formats but printed manuscript is the preferred medium for present development.

Major renovations and expansion is scheduled as the collection grows to 60,000 holdings. The library was reviewed by the Association of Theological Schools (ATS) in 2008 for accreditation. The Urshan Library maintains membership in the American Theological Library Association(ATLA), and the Missouri Educational Resources Network (MOREnet).

References

External links 
Urshan Graduate School of Theology
Urshan College

University and college academic libraries in the United States
Libraries in Missouri
Buildings and structures in St. Louis County, Missouri